Maningory is a river in the region of Analanjirofo in north-eastern Madagascar. It takes it source in Lake Alaotra and flows into the Indian Ocean near Antakobola.

The Maningory Falls of 90 meters are situated 20 km from Imerimandroso.

References

Rivers of Analanjirofo
Rivers of Madagascar